Marty Fine (born July 30, 1959) is an American football coach. He was the head football coach at New Mexico Highlands University. Fine served as the head football coach at Sonoma State University from 1987 to 1988 and Bryant University from 2004 to 2016.

Head coaching record

References

External links
 New Mexico Highlands profile
 Bryant profile

1959 births
Living people
Bryant Bulldogs football coaches
Colgate Raiders football coaches
Indiana Hoosiers football coaches
Indiana State Sycamores football coaches
Iowa State Cyclones football coaches
New Mexico Highlands Cowboys football coaches
Sonoma State Cossacks football coaches
Western New Mexico Mustangs football coaches
High school football coaches in Rhode Island
Union Dutchmen football players
Western New Mexico University alumni
People from Tarrytown, New York